Cemile Sultan ("beautiful, radiant"; 17 August 1843 – 26 February 1915) was an Ottoman princess, the daughter of Sultan Abdulmejid I and Düzdidil Hanım. She was the half sister of Sultans Murad V, Abdul Hamid II, Mehmed V, and Mehmed VI.

Early life
Cemile Sultan was born on 17 August 1843 in the Old Beylerbeyi Palace. Her father was Sultan Abdulmejid I, and her mother was Düzdidil Hanım. She was the third child and the third daughter of her mother. She had two elder sisters,  twin Neyire Sultan and Münire Sultan, two years older than her, and a younger sister Samiye Sultan, all died young.

In 1845, Düzdidil Hanım died leaving Cemile Sultan motherless at the age of two. Abdulmejid took her to her first legal wife, Perestu Kadın, and entrusted her into the lady's care. She grew up together with her half-brother Abdul Hamid II, who was also adopted by Perestu, in the same household and spent their childhoods with one another. The two siblings were very close, and Cemile was influential in the first years of Abdülhamid II's reign. 

Abdülmecid wanted all his sons and daughters to have a high-level and as complete as possible education, which included both traditional subjects, including Koranic studies, and Western ones. Cemile's education began in 1847. She attended the lessons with her half-brother Şehzade Mehmed Reşad and Murad V, her adoptive brother Abdülhamid, and her half-sisters Fatma Sultan and Refia Sultan. Her education continued ever after marriage. She also learnt Arabic and Persian. She also learnt French which became prominent during the Tanzimat era. She also learned French and Western music. She acquired her piano lessons from an Italian lady Therese Romano.

She was her father's favorite daughter, who praised her continuously.

Marriage
In 1854, at the age of eleven, Abdulmejid betrothed her to Mahmud Celaleddin Pasha, the son of the Imperial son-in-law, Damat Ahmed Fethi Pasha, and his first wife Ayşe Şemsinur Hanım. Fethi Pasha had himself been married to Cemile's aunt, Atiye Sultan. The wedding took place on 17 May 1858, and was consummated on 11 June 1858. The couple was given a palace at Findiklı as their residence.

The wedding of her half-sister Münire Sultan was also celebrated on the same day. The cost of the ceremony was bitterly criticized, because the Ottoman army had just suffered heavy defeats in Montenegro and Crete was in revolt. At her marriage, her mother-in-law presented Mediha Nazikeda Kadın, who would later become first consort of Sultan Abdul Hamid II, Cemile's adoptive brother. Among her ladies in attendance was Aliye Nazikeda Hanim, who became the third wife of Şehzade Yusuf Izzeddin, eldest son of Abdülaziz. Furthermore, Cemile Sultan took into service Emine Nazikeda Hanım, future consort of Mehmed VI, together with her sisters Daryal and Naciye Hanım and her cousins Amine, Rumeysa, Pakize, Fatma and Kamile Hanim. The future Mehmed VI asked Cemile for permission to marry Nazikeda in 1884, but she initially refused, finally agreeing after a year of prodding, when Mehmed swore that, if he could not marry Nazikeda, then he would never marry, and that, if she became his wife, he would take no other consorts.

The two together had six children, three sons, Sultanzade Besim Bey and twins Sultanzade Mehmed Mahmud Celaleddin Bey and Sultanzade Mehmed Sakıb Bey, and three daughters, Fethiye Hanımsultan, Ayşe Sıdıka Hanımsultan and Fatma Hanımsultan.

The couple supported Abdul Hamid's accession to the throne in 1876. In 1877, the two of them used every incident to stir the sultan against the then grand vizier Midhat Pasha, in particular his attachment to the Young Ottomans, attributing all their statements to his influence. Finally, holding Midhat responsible for the failure of the conference, Abdul Hanid decided to send him on an extended trip to Europe. Midhat was removed from the office of grand vizierate and was replaced by Ibrahim Edhem Pasha. Abdul Hamid's mistrust of Mahmud Celaleddin Pasha led to the latter's exile to Arabia in 1881, where he was strangled in 1884. Princess Cemile withdrew from society for some twenty years, afterwards reconciling with her brother and paying calls again at the palace.

Death
Cemile Sultan died at Erenköy, Istanbul on 26 February 1915 at the age of seventy-one, and was buried in the mausoleum of her father, Sultan Abdulmejid.

In 2005, at least fourteen of her descendants from her three married with issue children were still alive.

Personality
On ceremonial occasions, Cemile Sultan took precedence as she was the eldest, and always took her place at Abdul Hamid's right. A large armchair was reserved for her on the right-hand side, where she took a seat. In processions, she walked at the side of Perestu Kadın, ahead of everyone else.

She always wore brown-colored dresses and on her head a hotoz of the same color, fashioned of lace or tulle. She dressed in the Turkish style, with a long train fastened to her waist. Since the sumptuous fabrics she wore were always various shades of brown, this color served as something of a hallmark for her. She wore no jewels whatsoever. Despite this simplicity, her imperial bearing amply conveyed her rank of princess.

Those in a position to know said that she looked just like her father. Everyone in the palace felt great respect and fondness for Princess Cemile, holding her in affectionate esteem. She spoke so graciously and intelligently, not laughing when it was not called for, and exhibiting toward everyone the appropriate conduct due to them. She was considered the perfect Ottoman princess and for this, she was Abdülmecid I's favorite daughter.

Honours

 Order of the House of Osman, Jeweled
 Order of the Medjidie, Jeweled
 Order of Charity,  1st Class
 Hicaz Demiryolu Medal in Gold

Issue

In popular culture
In the 2017 TV series Payitaht: Abdülhamid, Cemile Sultan is portrayed by Turkish actress Devrim Yakut.

Ancestry

See also
 List of Ottoman princesses

References

Sources

 
 

1843 births
1915 deaths
19th-century Ottoman princesses
20th-century Ottoman princesses